Waseda Station is the name of two train stations in Japan:

 Waseda Station (Tokyo Metro), a rapid transit station in Shinjuku, Tokyo.
 Waseda Station (Toden), a light rail station in Shinjuku, Tokyo.